The Lydersen method is a group contribution method for the estimation of critical properties temperature (Tc), pressure (Pc) and volume (Vc). The Lydersen method is the prototype for and ancestor of many new models like Joback, Klincewicz, 
Ambrose, 
Gani-Constantinou and others.

The Lydersen method is based in case of the critical temperature on the Guldberg rule which establishes a relation between the normal boiling point and the critical temperature.

Equations

Critical temperature 

Guldberg has found that a rough estimate of the normal boiling point Tb, when expressed in kelvins (i.e., as an absolute temperature), is approximately two-thirds of the critical temperature Tc. Lydersen uses this basic idea but calculates more accurate values.

Critical pressure

Critical volume 

M is the molar mass and Gi are the group contributions (different for all three properties) for functional groups of a molecule.

Group contributions

Example calculation 

Acetone is fragmented in two different groups, one carbonyl group and two methyl groups. For the critical volume the following calculation results: 

Vc = 40 + 60.0 + 2 * 55.0 = 210 cm3

In the literature (such as in the Dortmund Data Bank) the values 215.90 cm3, 230.5 cm3  and 209.0 cm3  are published.

References 

Physical chemistry
Thermodynamic models